The simple-station Universidad Nacional de Colombia is part of the TransMilenio mass-transit system of Bogotá, Colombia, opened in the year 2000.

Location
The station is located north of downtown Bogotá, specifically on Avenida NQS with entrances on Calles 45A and 48.

History
This station opened in 2005 as part of the second line of phase two of TransMilenio construction, opening service to Avenida NQS. 
It serves the demand of the Universidad Nacional de Colombia and surrounding neighborhoods.

Station Services

Old trunk services

Main Line Service

Feeder routes
This station does not have connections to feeder routes.

Inter-city service
This station does not have inter-city service.

See also
Bogotá
TransMilenio
List of TransMilenio Stations

External links
 TransMilenio

TransMilenio